Savanchakovo is a rural locality (a village) in Borisoglebskoye Rural Settlement, Muromsky District, Vladimir Oblast, Russia. The population was 66 as of 2010. There are 5 streets.

Geography 
Savanchakovo is located 29 km northwest of Murom (the district's administrative centre) by road. Starye Kotlitsy is the nearest rural locality.

References 

Rural localities in Muromsky District
Muromsky Uyezd